Mohammad Arab-Salehi (born 1963) is an Iranian philosopher and associate professor of religion at the Research Institute for Islamic Culture and Thought. He is also the head of Hikmat and Religious Studies Faculty of the Institute. 
Arab-Salehi is known for his works on hermeneutics and historicism and is a recipient of the Iranian Book of the Season Award for his book Historicism and Religion (2012).

Books
 The Problem of Revelation, 2009
 Al-Ghaib and Life, 2014
 Understanding in the Trap of Historicism, 2010
 Historicism and Religion, 2012
 Methodology of Divine Commandment, 2015

References

External links
 Arab-Salehi at the Research Institute for Islamic Culture and Thought

Living people
20th-century Iranian philosophers
Academic staff of the Research Institute for Islamic Culture and Thought
1963 births
21st-century Iranian philosophers